Peter Schlagenhauf (born March 19, 1960) is a retired Swiss professional ice hockey right winger who last played for GCK Lions in the National League B. He also represented the Swiss national team at several international tournaments, including the 1988 Winter Olympics.

Career statistics

References

External links

1960 births
Living people
GCK Lions players
Ice hockey players at the 1988 Winter Olympics
EHC Kloten players
Olympic ice hockey players of Switzerland
Swiss ice hockey right wingers